Vicirionessa signata is a species of jumping spider in the genus Vicirionessa from Africa. The species, first known as Brancus signata, was first described in 2016 by Angelika Dawidowicz and Wanda Wesołowska. The spider is small and yellow with a chevron pattern on its abdomen and teardrop shapes on its carapace, after which it is named. The first example was found in Kenya, but the range was extended to include Ivory Coast in 2022.

Taxonomy
Vicirionessa signata was first described in 2016 by Angelika Dawidowicz and Wanda Wesołowska. It is one of over 500 species identified by Wesołowska. The species name is Latin for marked, which is named for the two teardrop-shaped patches on the carapace. The spider was initially placed in the genus Brancus. In 2022, Wesołowska and Anthony Russell-Smith recognised that Brancus was a junior synonym of the genus Thyene but that all the species except the type species needed to be allocated to a new genus. The new genus was called Vicirionessa, a combination of the name Viciria and the ending nessa. The genus is related to Evarcha and Hyllus.

Description
Only the female of the species has been described. The ovoid yellow carapace is widest halfway along its length, with black rings surrounding the eyes.It has a distinctive pattern in the shape of two tear-drop shaped patches. The abdomen is also yellow with a pattern of brown chevrons. The spider is covered with generally small brown hairs. The epigyne has two depressions, the edges of which form distinctive flanges. It is most similar to Vicirionessa peckhamorum'', differing mainly in the shape and design of the seminal ducts, which are short and multichambered.

Distribution
The species was originally known only from a single locality in Kenya near Mount Elgon. In 2022, when Wesołowska and Anthony Russell-Smith were undertaking an assessment of a large collection of spiders brought by Jean-Claude Ledoux from Ivory Coast to France between August 1974 and January 1976, they discovered another example that originated in the Lamto Scientific Reserve in Ivory Coast. It is now recognised as having a species distribution that includes both countries.

References

Citations

Bibliography

Fauna of Ivory Coast
Fauna of Kenya
Salticidae
Spiders of Africa
Spiders described in 2016
Taxa named by Wanda Wesołowska